Still in Love may refer to:

 Still in Love (album), a 1982 album by Carrie Lucas
 "Still in Love (Kissing You)", a Beyoncé Knowles cover version of the song "Kissing You" by Des'ree
 "Still in Love", a song by 112 from Part III
 "Still in Love" (Brian McKnight song), from the album I Remember You
 "Still in Love", a song by Brooke Fraser from What to Do with Daylight
 "Still in Love", a song by Corey Hart from Young Man Running
 "Still in Love", a song by Nick Cave and the Bad Seeds from Nocturama
 "Still in Love", a song by David Gates, from the album Take Me Now
 "Still in Love", a song by Lionel Richie from Louder Than Words
 "Still in Love", a song by Diana Ross from Silk Electric
 "Still in Love", a song by Supertramp from Brother Where You Bound
 "Still in Love", a song by Tyra B
 Still in Love (horse), a Japanese Thoroughbred racehorse and broodmare

See also
 Still in Love with You (disambiguation)
 I'm Still in Love with You (disambiguation)